"Stand Up for Love" is a song recorded by American group Destiny's Child for their first greatest hits album #1's (2005). The song was written by Amy Foster-Gillies and David Foster, with the latter also serving as the producer with Humberto Gatica. Musically, "Stand Up for Love" is a mid-tempo contemporary R&B ballad drawing influences from pop. Inspired by poverty-stricken children and families, the song was termed the "2005 World Children's Day Anthem" and used in conjunction with Ronald McDonald House Charities in order to raise awareness of the day. "Stand Up for Love" was released as the lead single from #1's on September 27, 2005, by Columbia Records and Sony Urban Music; it was the final single released before the group's disbandment in 2006.

Upon its release, "Stand Up for Love" received negative reviews from music critics, who criticized its composition and inclusion on #1's. Initially, the song was the group's only single not to enter any record charts; however, it peaked at number 37 in South Korea in 2014. The accompanying music video for the song, directed by Matthew Rolston, featured the trio singing the song, both individually and together. "Stand Up for Love" was performed live by Destiny's Child in November 2005 at the Jimmy Kimmel Live! show and on World Children's Day at the Ronald McDonald House in Los Angeles. Several South Korean groups and singers have covered the song.

Writing and production

Canadian musician David Foster was inspired to write "Stand Up for Love" for poverty-stricken children and families which receive funds from charitable organization. Destiny's Child lead singer Beyoncé acknowledged that they wanted to record the song for the people who help impoverished families. She furthered by saying: "The kids we've met have no idea how much they've given us. We wanted to record this song for them, in hopes that people would hear their voice through ours." Michelle Williams explained the song was her "favorite" and went on to describe it as "one of the best songs that we've done collectively", emphasizing the vocal performance.

"Stand Up for Love" was composed and arranged by Foster, who also served as its co-writer along with his daughter Amy Foster-Gillies. Foster produced the song with Humberto Gatica, who also engineered and mixed it. The song was recorded at Chartmaker Studios and The Record Plant, and was mixed at the former. Nathan East was responsible for playing the bass, while Vinnie Colaiuta and Paulinho Da Costa handled the drums and percussion, respectively.

Music and lyrics

"Stand Up for Love" is a pop and R&B ballad with a length of four minutes and 46 seconds. According to the sheet music published by Peer International Corporation on the website Musicnotes.com, "Stand Up for Love" is set in common time with a slow tempo of seventy beats per minute. It is written in the key of A major, and Destiny's Child's vocals range from the low note of E3 to the high note of E5. Michael D. Clark from the Houston Chronicle compared Beyoncé's vocals with Michael Jackson and Whitney Houston "in an effort to play the weepy heartstrings". Matthew Jacobs, writing on behalf of HuffPost compared the song's sound to a movie ballad from the 1990s, taken from an "empowering" animated movie. Lyrically, the song encourages togetherness: "And I believe that in my life I will see / An end to hopelessness, or giving up, or suffering / If we all stand together this one time / Then no one will get left behind".

Release and promotion
"Stand Up for Love" was released as the lead single from #1's by Columbia Records and Sony Urban Music, and became the group's final single together before their disbandment. It was sent to rhythmic contemporary radio stations in the United States on September 27, 2005, and was released as a 7-inch single the same day. On October 4, it impacted contemporary hit radio in the US. The song was touted as the "2005 World Children's Day Anthem" in conjunction with Ronald McDonald House Charities. It was used to raise awareness of the day; Destiny's Child were also global ambassadors for the 2005 program.

In August 2007, the Society for the Promotion of Community Standards (SPCS) requested "Stand Up for Love" to be played on radio stations in New Zealand to reflect on child abuse after the Nia Glassie abuse case received widespread media attention. Similarly, organizations Sensible Sentencing Trust, Family First, and For the Sake of Our Children Trust asked for increased airplay of the song during a three-minute silence, which was also requested by them.

Critical reception
"Stand Up for Love" received negative reviews from most music critics. James Blake writing for BBC Online, described "Stand Up for Love" as a "sugary ballad". Pitchfork Medias writer Jess Harvell criticized the song by writing: "Opener 'Stand Up for Love' is subtitled the '2005 World Children's Day Anthem', which should tell you all you really need to know, i.e. Diane Warren should be banned under the Geneva Conventions". Fiona Mckinlay criticized the fact that the song was used as an opener for #1's and felt it wasn't "really causing any kind of reaction before they get started properly with Independent Woman Pt.1". Houston Chronicles Michael D. Clark described the track as "overwrought and overproduced; at best, it's a future prom theme". Matthew Jacobs of The Huffington Post felt it was "great" the song was used for World's Children day but described it as a "total snoozefest". Chuck Taylor of Billboard commented that the song lacked the potential to become a chart-topper. Taylor reviewed the song negatively, classifying it as a "schmaltzy" ballad aimed at adult contemporary radio, adding that it was a "disappointing nonstarter".

Jim Kiest from the San Antonio Express-News wrote "hopefully 'Stand Up for Love' won't be [a number-one single]". Aidin Vaziri of San Francisco Chronicle, who positively reviewed #1's, concluded his review by writing: "And the less said about the very new stuff, including the single 'Stand Up for Love (2005 World Children's Day Anthem),' the sweeter the memories". Similarly, Hattie Collins of Yahoo! Music felt that "Stand Up for Love" was "stuffed full of lazy lyricisms and sloppily sentimentality" further describing it as "utterly vomitous". She felt that the song was one of the material that "let this otherwise cracking compilation down". Slant Magazines Sal Cinquemani panned the song as "awful and saccharine" and felt that it "show[s] that the women of Destiny's Child are squarely focused on their (solo) futures". In contrast, Lindsey Weber from Vulture put "Stand Up for Love" at number 16 on her list of the top 25 songs by Destiny's Child in 2013.

Accolades

Music video
The accompanying music video for "Stand Up for Love" was directed by Matthew Rolston. It was filmed in September 2005, following Destiny's Child final concert as part of their tour Destiny Fulfilled... and Lovin' It in Vancouver. MTV News described it as a performance video. It features all members, wearing black dresses, singing their respective solo verses individually and later together during the song's chorus in front of a screen which displays videos of children and different scenery. During the end, the group is seen wearing white clothes and performing the song in a white setting; several shots are filmed using a black-and-white technique. It was released via MTV's official website on October 25, 2005. The video was also included on the video album Destiny's Child Video Anthology (2013). At the 2006 MTV Video Music Awards Japan, "Stand Up for Love" received a nomination in the category for Best R&B Video, but lost to Ai "Story". The same year, the visual was nominated in the category for Outstanding Music Video at the 37th NAACP Image Awards, but lost to Alicia Keys "Unbreakable" (2005).

Live performances
Destiny's Child performed "Stand Up for Love" for the first time on November 15, 2005, along with "Survivor", on the show Jimmy Kimmel Live!. It marked the group's final televised performance before their disbandment. The same day, they performed the song at Ronald McDonald House Charities in Los Angeles for World Children's Day.

Cover versions
On December 29, 2008, Girls' Generation's Taeyeon, Davichi and Wonder Girls's Sunye, performed "Stand Up for Love" in a special stage called "Diva" at SBS Gayo Daejeon. On June 3, 2011, South Korean band Rania, performed "Stand Up for Love" at MBC's radio programme Shimshimtapa. In April 2013, singer Aram, a member of the South Korean group Global Icon, uploaded a cover of "Stand Up for Love". A writer from Allkpop described it as "beautiful" and praised her for "hit[ting] every note with perfect control". At the 2014 Miss Thailand World, contestant Maeya performed "Stand Up for Love". Bangkok Post writer Pim Ungphakorn described it as a "beautiful rendition".

Formats and track listings

Promotional maxi CD single
 "Stand Up for Love" (radio edit) – 4:26
 "Stand Up for Love" – 4:46
 "Stand Up for Love" (instrumental) – 4:45
 "Call Out Hook" – 0:12

7-inch vinyl
 "Stand Up for Love" – 4:46
 "Stand Up for Love" (instrumental) – 4:45

Credits and personnel
Credits are adapted from the liner notes of the album #1's.

Courtney Blooding – production coordination
Jules Chaikin – orchestra contractor
Vinnie Colaiuta – drums
Paulinho Da Costa – percussion
Neil Devor – digital engineering
Nathan East – bass
David Foster – music writing, production, arrangement, string arrangement, keyboards
Amy Foster-Gillies –lyrics
Humberto Gatica – production, engineering, mixing

Beyoncé Knowles – vocals, vocal production
Jason Larian – assistance
Dean Parks – guitar
Alejandro Roodriguez – digital engineering
Bill Ross – string arrangement
Kelly Rowland – vocals, vocal production
Michelle Williams – vocals
Jochem van der Saag – organ, sound design, programming

Charts

Weekly charts

Release history

References

2000s ballads
2005 songs
2005 singles
Charity singles
Pop ballads
Contemporary R&B ballads
Columbia Records singles
Destiny's Child songs
Music videos directed by Matthew Rolston
Songs written by David Foster
Songs written by Amy S. Foster
Song recordings produced by David Foster